The Teluk Gilimanuk class is a class of medium landing ship (LSM) that currently being operated by Indonesian Navy. They were originally built in the East Germany for the Volksmarine as the Hoyerswerda class (NATO reporting name: Frosch I and II classes). This ships were acquired by Indonesian Navy in the 1990s.

Design 
Teluk Gilimanuk or Hoyerswerda class consisted of two variants, the Project 108 (Frosch I) regular medium landing ship and Project 109 (Frosch II) combat support ship.

The ships is powered by two diesel engines, with total power output of  distributed in two shaft.

The ships is powered by two diesel engines, with total power output of  distributed in two shaft.

The ships was initially armed with two  twin 57 mm guns, complemented by two AK-230 twin barrel 30 mm guns and two  twin 25 mm autocannons for Project 108 and Project 109 respectively. Some ships of Project 108 also equipped with two 40-tube 122 mm rocket launchers. Both variants also equipped with Muff Cob fire control radar. In Indonesian service, the Project 108 are rearmed with one single Bofors 40 mm L/60 gun, one twin V-11 37 mm L/63 guns, and two twin 2М-3 25 mm autocannons. The Project 109 also rearmed in Indonesian service with two twin V-11 37 mm L/63 guns and two twin 2M-3 25 mm autocannons.

Development
Twelve former German Democratic Republic fast medium landing ships (531 to 542) of the Project 108 (Frosch I) class were built by VEB Peenewerft, Wolgast, to an East German design between 1976 and 1979 as Hoyerswerda class named after the East German town of Hoyerswerda. Officially transferred to Indonesian Navy on 25 August 1993. Refitted in German yards prior to transfer, where all armament was removed, to be replaced later after delivery. A very valuable addition to the Indonesian Navy's landing forces in view of the block obsolescence of the Ex-US LST Mark 3 landing ships. The 37 mm guns have replaced the original 57 mm and 30 mm twin guns.

Two logistic support ships of the Project 109 (Frosch II) class also transferred to Indonesian Navy on 25 August 1993 and were built by the same shipyard as a development of the Frosch I landing ships. Originally commissioned in the Volksmarine on 3 October 1979 and 26 February 1980, respectively. Fitted with an 8-tons crane amidships and a bow ramp as on the Frosch I class. All armament also removed prior to transfer, later to be rearmed in Indonesia. Both refitted at Rostock and recommissioned on 25 April 1995. 37 mm guns fitted after transfer. Rocket launchers are mounted forward of the bridge.

Operational history
The Teluk Gilimanuk-class ships were bought on 3 September 1992 based on President Instruction No. 3/1992 that was decided by late President Soeharto. The procurement also include 16  and 9 Kondor-class vessels worth a total cost of $482 million.

Ships
Originally fourteen Teluk Gilimanuk-class LSMs have been commissioned by the Indonesian Navy, but recently only eleven ships are still in active service, two ships were lost due to an accident and one ship was retired. All were built by VEB Peenewerft.

See also
 List of active Indonesian Navy ships
 Polnocny-class landing ship
 Ropucha-class landing ship

References

Bibliography

External links

Frosch-class landing ships
Ships built in Wolgast
Ships built in East Germany